Jean Boissonnat (16 January 1929 – 25 September 2016) was a French economic journalist. He was the co-founder and editor-in-chief of L'Expansion. He was the author of several books.

Early life
Jean Boissonnat was born on 16 January 1929 in Paris, France. He graduated from Sciences Po. While he was a student, he joined Jeunesse Étudiante Chrétienne.

Career
Boissonnat was a faculty member at his alma mater, Sciences Po, from 1960 to 1971.

Boissonnat was an economic journalist for La Croix from 1954 to 1967. In 1967, he co-founded L'Expansion with Jean-Louis Servan-Schreiber. He served as its editor-in-chief from 1967 to 1986, and as its senior editor from 1986 to 1994. He also served as the editor-in-chief of La Tribune from 1987 to 1992. He later founded L'Entreprise.

Boissonnat was also a commentator on Europe 1. Additionally, he wrote articles for Le Parisien, Le Midi libre, Le Progrès, L’Est républicain and Ouest-France. He served on the board of directors of Bayard Presse.

Boissonnat was the author of several books.

Death
Boissonnat died of a stroke on 25 September 2016 in Paris, France. He was 87 years old.

Works

References

1929 births
2016 deaths
Journalists from Paris
Sciences Po alumni
Academic staff of Sciences Po
Business and financial journalists